Deuterocohnia meziana is a plant species in the genus Deuterocohnia. This species is native to Bolivia.

Cultivars
 × Dyckcohnia 'Conrad Morton'

References

BSI Cultivar Registry Retrieved 11 October 2009

meziana
Flora of Bolivia